The 1929 West Tennessee State Teachers football team was an American football team that represented West Tennessee State Teachers College (now known as the University of Memphis) as a member of the Mississippi Valley Conference during the 1929 college football season. In their sixth season under head coach Zach Curlin, West Tennessee State Teachers compiled a 8–0–2 record.

Schedule

References

West Tennessee State Teachers
Memphis Tigers football seasons
College football undefeated seasons
West Tennessee State Teachers football